You Can't Stop the Bum Rush is the third studio album by Canadian alternative rock band Len, released on May 25, 1999, through Work Records. The album featured the top ten hit "Steal My Sunshine", which was previously featured on the soundtrack to the 1999 comedy thriller Go. It also managed to peak at No. 46 on the Billboard 200 albums chart and go Gold in the U.S. The album had a mostly positive response from critics. "The Hard Disk Approach" features lyrics entirely in German and uses a motorik beat to emulate the style of krautrock bands. The album also featured Buck 65 on the cover of the album, although he reportedly declined an offer to join the band. Despite this, he provides record scratches on the track "Cold Chillin'".

Background
Prior to the release of You Can't Stop the Bum Rush, Len solely consisted of siblings Marc and Sharon Costanzo, who predominately made alternative rock music. The duo independently released two studio albums, Superstar (1995) and Get Your Legs Broke (1997), on their own record label, Funtrip Records. Following these releases, the duo became tired of producing rock music and considered disbandment. Marc explained: "I was writing, then I thought, ‘This is bullshit; I can't write this shit.' I hated playing guitar." The duo, however, became inspired again after experimenting with hip hop music, opting to move in this direction after receiving positive reception from music industry officials. This reception resulted in Len signing with a major record label, the Work Group, and branching outside of being a duo, with the addition of group members Derek "D Rock" MacKenzie, Brian "DJ Moves" Higgins, Philip "Planet Pea" Rae, and Drunkness Monster.

Music and lyrics
The standard edition of You Can't Stop the Bum Rush includes 12 tracks; the Japanese edition includes one additional track. Len intended to create a sonically diverse album, with Marc Costanzo commenting: "We didn't want people to be mad at us when they bought the album and expected 13 'Sunshines.' There's something [on the album] for the ravers, the Adidas-wearing old-school hip-hop heads, and 14-year-old-girls." The album includes a variety of styles, including rap, rock, and pop. The album makes a heavy use of samples, with band member D Rock commenting that "[we] don't take ourselves too seriously." Guest appearances include Biz Markie, Kurtis Blow, and C.C. DeVille of Poison.

Title and artwork
The title, You Can't Stop the Bum Rush, refers to the breaking down of barricades, with D Rock commenting that the idea behind it is that "[Len is] coming, you can't stop us." However, the group maintains that the title was created as a joke, with D Rock further adding: "[Len is the] first Canadian band with no talent whatsoever to actually make it to Letterman."

Len was responsible for the album's art direction, whilst Drazen helmed the cartoon art. The cover features cartoon versions of the Len group members, in addition to alternative hip hop musician Buck 65, lined up on a city sidewalk. The idea for the cover stemmed from a conversation between Marc and Sharon where Marc discussed "how funny it would be if we [became] cartoon characters." Outside of the cover, Drazen drew a city—referred to by Marc as "Len land"—containing other eccentric characters, which is placed throughout the CD booklet. The cover was originally a picture that Marc took of himself and Sharon, although this cover was scrapped as Marc believed it would fail to grab the attention of consumers. The Work Group was strongly against the decision to release the album using Drazen's cartoon art.

Release and promotion
To promote the album, Len headlined the Canadian Edgefest tour in 1999, replacing Eve 6 after they dropped out due to illness. The tour lasted two weeks, from July 1 to 14. In the United States, Len embarked on a tour consisting of 22 shows in the fall of 1999. The tour commenced on October 7 in Chicago, Illinois and concluded on November 6 in Dallas, Texas, with most appearances being at clubs and music festivals. The tour was initially scheduled to begin on July 27 in Washington D.C., although the Len group members had faced difficulty in securing the proper visa paperwork in time for the tour date. To further promote the album, Len made a variety of radio and television appearances, including an August 6 appearance on the Late Show with David Letterman.

Critical reception

You Can't Stop the Bum Rush received a mildly positive reception from music critics who praised the genre-hopping in the tracks and the light-hearted delivery used for them. John Bush of AllMusic found the rapping offbeat and the album a lesser version of the Beastie Boys' Hello Nasty but said that the production was "excellent" and the tracks "enjoyable", concluding that "the album's few derivative qualities never really get in the way of an enjoyable listen." Tony Scherman of The New York Times credited the album for offering more than just "Steal My Sunshine" by dabbling into different genres, highlighting the four hip-hop songs for being injected with a sunny demeanor, concluding that: "Any unheralded group that cuts an album with at least a half-dozen memorable songs, and two addictive ones, deserves special attention." Karen Schoemer of Rolling Stone praised Marc Costanzo for his versatile production on the album and for being an alternative to Fred Durst by being goofy and less serious, concluding that: "Twelve years ago, these guys might have been Camper Van Beethoven, taking the piss out of college rock. Today, another genre needs them more."

Track listing

Notes
 "Steal My Sunshine" embodies portions of "More, More, More" by Andrea True Connection.
 "Cryptik Souls Crew" contains elements from "Dynomite" by Bazuka and "Let's Have Some Fun" by The Bar-Kays.
 "Beautiful Day" embodies portions of "A Girl Like You" by John Travolta.
 "Hot Rod Monster Jam" contains a sample from "The Lion Sleeps Tonight" by The Tokens and "White Lines (Don't Don't Do It)" by Melle Mel; embodies portions of "Shop Around" by The Miracles and "Do Your Duty" by Beat Master Clay.
 "Cold Chillin'" contains a sample from "Pimpin' Ain't Easy" by Big Daddy Kane and "You Gots to Chill" by EPMD.
 "Feelin' Alright" embodies portions of "Let Me Down Easy" by Hydra.
 "Big Meanie" embodies portions of "Hydra" by Grover Washington Jr.

Personnel
Adapted from the You Can't Stop the Bum Rush inlay notes.

Cryptik Souls Crew
 Obe One
 Vandal
 Abs
 Asicks
 KNG

Artwork
 Len - art direction
 Helios - design and layout
 Drazen - cartoon art
 Stephen Chung - photo art

Management
 Jonathan Simkin (Simkin & Co.) - lawyer
 Graeme Lowe and Jon Leshay (Storefront Entertainment, LLC.) - management
 Phil Cassens - A&R
 Barbara Bausman - product manager
 Julie Chamberlain - production coordinator

Musicians
 Matt Kelly - guitar (on tracks 1 and 10)
 Felix Wittholz - vocals (on track 5)
 Brendan Canning - keyboard (on track 5)
 C.C. DeVille - guitar (on track 8)
 Larry Ciancia - drums (on track 8)
 Mike Catano - drums (on track 9)
 Suzie Katayama - string arrangement and cello (on tracks 10 and 11)
 David Stenske - viola (on tracks 10 and 11)
 Michael McCarty - drum sounds

Additional musicians
 Tom Biederman - trumpet (on tracks 11 and 12)
 David Biederman - sax (on tracks 11 and 12)
 Andrew Thompson - guitar (on tracks 11 and 12)
 Dave Leitad - Rhodes keyboard (on tracks 11 and 12)
 Eve Butler - violin (on track 11)
 Kori Ayukawa - bass (on track 12)
 Wilson Laurencin - drums (on track 12)

Charts

Weekly charts

Year-end charts

Certifications and sales

Release history

References

External links
 You Can't Stop the Bum Rush at Discogs

1999 albums
Len (band) albums
Work Records albums